Kwon Yong-Hyun (born 23 October 1991) is a South Korean footballer who plays as midfielder for Malaysia Super League club UiTM.

Career
He was selected by Suwon FC in 2013 K League Draft.

In 2021, he also joined UiTM FC in Malaysia

References

External links 

1991 births
Living people
Association football defenders
South Korean footballers
Suwon FC players
Jeju United FC players
Gyeongnam FC players
Busan IPark players
Korea National League players
K League 2 players
K League 1 players
Howon University alumni